is the earliest surviving Japanese anime broadcast on television. Originally airing on July 14, 1958, on NTV and again on October 15, 1958, the nine-minute animation was the first televised Japanese animation and the first example of a full color broadcast.

Plot 
Mole's Adventure is about a mole, who is bothered by the sun's light. So, he decides to leave the Earth in a rocket ship. He lands on a strange planet, where he travels over the land on a set of skis. He meets & is bothered by the planet's weird creatures, which live above & below the planet's soil. After using a flashlight to make the creatures scatter, he is then hit by the sun's rays again, causing him to fall off the planet. While falling, the mole wakes up, realizing it was all just a dream.

References

1958 anime films
Science fiction anime and manga
1950s animated short films
Anime short films
Nippon TV original programming
1958 television films
1958 films